Ashgabat railway station is the main railway station in Ashgabat, Turkmenistan. It was originally built in 1888, but had to be rebuilt after an earthquake in 1948. The station is operated by the Türkmendemirýollary.

History 

The station was built in 1888, but was completely demolished in 1948 by the Ashgabat earthquake. It was rebuilt in 1950 on the foundations of the old railway station.

In 2009 the building was given a new look. The Turkish company "Belda Insaat" designed and radically reconstructed the railway station.

Service 
There are 7 train routes, 2 for transporting good and five for passenger service. The train from Ashgabat to Serakhs leaves the station twice a week, the rest are daily departures.

Passenger trains:
601/602 Ashgabat - Serhetabat - Ashgabat
604/603 Ashgabat - Balkanabad - Ashgabat
606/605 Ashgabat - Turkmenbashi - Ashgabat
607/608 Ashgabat - Dashoguz - Ashgabat
615/606 Ashgabat - Sarahs - Ashgabat

Transportation of goods:
3/4 Ashgabat - Türkmenabat - Ashgabat
95/96 Ashgabat - Atmurat - Ashgabat

See also 
 Transport in Turkmenistan
 Railway stations in Turkmenistan
 Trans-Caspian railway
 Trans-Karakum Railway
 North-South Transnational Railway

References

Railway stations in Turkmenistan
Railway stations opened in 1888
Buildings and structures in Ashgabat
Transport in Ashgabat